Sanda Ojiambo, is a Kenyan administrator who serves as the as assistant secretary-general of the United Nations Global Compact, effective April 2022. Before that, from 17 June 2020 until 22 April 2022, she served as executive director of the United Nations Global Compact, succeeding Lise Kingo of Denmark.

Background and education
Ojiambo was born in Kenya and she attended local schools for her primary and secondary education. She holds a Bachelor of Arts degree in Economics and International Development obtained from McGill University, in Montreal, Quebec, Canada. Her degree of Master of Arts in Public Policy, was obtained from the University of Minnesota, in Minneapolis.

Career
In 1997, she started working for CARE International in Somalia. From there she joined the United Nations Development Programme also in Somalia. She spent a total of five years in Somalia, leading programmes in areas including  "Education, Safe Motherhood, Environmental Conservation, Governance and Landmines Demining".

She then relocated to the Africa Regional Office of International Planned Parenthood Federation (IPPF), located in Nairobi, Kenya. There, she provided technical advice for "service delivery, accreditation standards, financial management, governance and advocacy". Her service area covered 40 countries. She worked in that capacity for another five years.

In 2008, Ojiambo joined Safaricom Plc, the largest  telecommunications company in Kenya. There she started out as the  Senior Manager of Safaricom and MPESA Foundations. In that capacity, she led the implementation of several public-private partnership initiatives between Safaricom and the United Nations organizations.

In 2010, she was appointed Head of Sustainable Business and Social Impact at Safaricom. Sanda leads the Corporate Responsibility Department that coordinates the integration of the Sustainable Development Goals (SDGs), sustainability reporting, technology for development products and the Safaricom and MPESA Foundations. Her team was able to deliver regular reports of their work. This raised a great amount of interest among stakeholders.

Other considerations
Before her appointment to head the UN Global Compact, Ojiambo sat on the board of directors for these companies:
(a) Kenya Investment Authority, a parastatal
(b) Gender Violence Recovery Centre, an NGO that provides services to survivors of gender violence
(c) Global Development Incubator, an international social enterprise aiming to drive the adoption of technology for development and
(d) Care Pay Limited, a health payments company. She also serves as a board of governor at Mpesa Foundation Academy.

See also
 Ogutu Okudo
 Edwin Macharia
 Sylvia Mulinge

References

External links
 Secretary-General Appoints Sanda Ojiambo of Kenya Executive Director, United Nations Global Compact As at 22 May 2020.

Living people
Year of birth missing (living people)
McGill University alumni
Humphrey School of Public Affairs alumni
Kenyan women
Safaricom people